Abdel-Fatah Qudsiyeh (born 1953) is since 2012 the deputy director of the Syrian National Security Bureau and a close adviser to President Bashar al-Assad.

Early life
Qudsiyeh was born in Hama in 1953.

Career
Qudsiyeh is a major general. He served in the special forces and was the head of the Air Force Intelligence Directorate of Syria. He also served as the head of the Syrian Military Intelligence Directorate from 2009 to July 2012. After the National Security headquarters bombing in July 2012, he was appointed as the deputy director of the National Security Bureau which became headed by Ali Mamlouk. Qudsiyeh was replaced by Rafiq Shahadah as general director of the military intelligence.

Sanctions
Since 9 May 2011, Qudsiyeh is one of several officials sanctioned by the European Union. He was added to the European Union's sanction list on the grounds that he "involved in violence against the civilian population" during the Syrian civil war. He was also sanctioned by the United States and the Swiss government.

References

1953 births
Living people
People of the Syrian civil war
Syrian generals
Syrian Alawites
People from Hama
Syrian individuals subject to U.S. Department of the Treasury sanctions
Syrian individuals subject to the European Union sanctions